Jeremy Roger Evans (born 23 Jun 1964) is a British politician who served as Deputy Mayor of London under Boris Johnson from 2015 to 2016. A member of the Conservative Party, he is a former member of the London Assembly for Havering and Redbridge and a former councillor and leader of the Conservative group in the London Borough of Waltham Forest.

Evans was born in Lancashire and moved to London in 1987. He worked for Royal Mail for 10 years before training as a barrister. He was called to the bar in 1997 and is a member of Middle Temple. He worked as a legal advisor to an IT recruitment company from 1998 to 2000.

Evans was elected to Waltham Forest council in 1990 and was the opposition spokesman on audit (1991), housing (1992), deputy leader (1993) and the leader of the Conservative group 1994–1998.

He was first elected to the London Assembly in 2000 and retained his seat in the 2004, 2008 and 2012 elections.
Until 2008 he was the Conservative spokesman for Transport and the Chairman of the Transport Committee. In September 2007 he was elected Deputy Leader of the Conservative group at City Hall. In 2008 he retained his seat in an election which returned Boris Johnson as London's Mayor and in September 2008 he became leader of the now eleven strong Conservative group, a post he held until 2011. In the 2012 elections he was returned with a reduced majority.

On 13 May 2015, Evans became Deputy Mayor of London, replacing Victoria Borwick who had been elected to parliament.

In May 2006 he was elected to Havering council, taking the former Labour stronghold of Elm Park in the South of the borough.

In 2016, Evans announced his retirement from politics to pursue a career as a public speaking coach.

References

External links
 MayorWatch Interview with Roger Evans

1964 births
Living people
Councillors in the London Borough of Waltham Forest
Politicians from Lancashire
Members of the Middle Temple
English LGBT politicians
Conservative Members of the London Assembly